Camp Viking may refer to:
 Red Beach Base Area, a complex of US and South Vietnamese military logistics and support bases during the Vietnam War
 Camp Viking was the name of the Danish section of Camp Bastion during the War in Afghanistan
 Camp Viking (military base), a UK military base in Norway